Ronetta Smith (born 2 May 1980) is a Jamaican sprinter.

Career

A 400m runner with a personal best of 51.23 (set in May 2005), Smith has never reached an international final in an individual race. However, she was a part of the Jamaican 4 x 400 meters relay teams that won the bronze medal at the 2003 World Championships and the silver medal at the 2005 World Championships. She ran for the relay team at the 2004 Summer Olympics, but only in the qualifying heat. Before the final heat she was replaced by Novlene Williams, with whom Jamaica eventually won the bronze medal.

Achievements

References

External links

Picture of Ronetta Smith

1980 births
Living people
Jamaican female sprinters
Athletes (track and field) at the 2004 Summer Olympics
Olympic athletes of Jamaica
Olympic bronze medalists for Jamaica
Athletes (track and field) at the 2002 Commonwealth Games
Athletes (track and field) at the 2006 Commonwealth Games
Commonwealth Games competitors for Jamaica
World Athletics Championships medalists
Medalists at the 2004 Summer Olympics
Olympic bronze medalists in athletics (track and field)
World Athletics Indoor Championships medalists
Athletes (track and field) at the 2007 Pan American Games
Pan American Games competitors for Jamaica
Olympic female sprinters
21st-century Jamaican women